The Joe Robbie Cup was a United States Soccer Federation sponsored invitational tournament held in Miami, Florida in February 1994. All four nations used the tournament as preparation for the 1994 FIFA World Cup, to be held later that year in the United States.

Results

Man of the Match:

Assistant referees:

Fourth official:

Goalscorers
1 goal
 Jaime Moreno
 Miguel Asprilla
 Wilson Pérez
 Henrik Larsson
 Kennet Andersson
 Mats Lilienberg
 Cobi Jones
 Hugo Pérez

Team statistics

External links
 Tournament results

Soccer in Florida
International association football competitions hosted by the United States
1994 in American soccer
1994 in Swedish football
1994 in Colombian football
1994 in Bolivian football